The Public Finance (Management and Control) Bill, 2009 is a bill proposed in the National Assembly of Nigeria to replace the Finance (Control and Management) act of 1958 with a new bill to provide for development of an economic and fiscal policy framework to regulate the financial management of government.
The bill was sponsored by Senator Kabiru Ibrahim Gaya.

References

Federal legislation of Nigeria
2009 in law
2009 in Nigeria
Public finance